The 2017–18 TNT KaTropa season was the 28th season of the franchise in the Philippine Basketball Association (PBA).

Key dates

2017
October 29: The 2017 PBA draft took place in Midtown Atrium, Robinson Place Manila.

Draft picks

Roster

Philippine Cup

Eliminations

Standings

Game log

|- style="background:#fcc;"
| 1
| December 22
| Rain or Shine
| L 79–82
| Jayson Castro (18)
| Troy Rosario (13)
| Jayson Castro (10)
| Cuneta Astrodome
| 0–1
|- style="background:#bfb;"
| 2
| December 29
| Alaska
| W 106–98
| Troy Rosario (21)
| three players (9)
| Roger Pogoy (8)
| Cuneta Astrodome
| 1–1

|- style="background:#fcc;"
| 3
| January 13
| San Miguel
| L 76–88
| Troy Rosario (15)
| Troy Rosario (13)
| Jayson Castro (8)
| University of San Agustin Gym
| 1–2
|- style="background:#bfb;"
| 4
| January 17
| Blackwater
| W 92–83
| Roger Pogoy (24)
| Moala Tautuaa (15)
| three players (3)
| Smart Araneta Coliseum
| 2–2
|- style="background:#bfb;"
| 5
| January 21
| Meralco
| W 99–81
| Troy Rosario (22)
| Troy Rosario (10)
| RR Garcia (8)
| Ynares Center
| 3–2
|- style="background:#fcc;"
| 6
| January 27
| Magnolia
| L 83–91
| Moala Tautuaa (16)
| Troy Rosario (12)
| three players (4)
| Smart Araneta Coliseum
| 3–3
|- style="background:#bfb;"
| 7
| January 31
| Kia
| W 90–85
| Kelly Williams (23)
| Roger Pogoy (11)
| Castro, Reyes (4)
| Mall of Asia Arena
| 4–3

|- style="background:#fcc;"
| 8
| February 7
| Phoenix
| L 72–74
| Anthony Semerad (12)
| Troy Rosario (8)
| Jayson Castro (5)
| Mall of Asia Arena
| 4–4
|- style="background:#fcc;"
| 9
| February 11
| Barangay Ginebra
| L 78–93
| Castro, Williams (17)
| Kelly Williams (15)
| Jayson Castro (4)
| Smart Araneta Coliseum
| 4–5
|- style="background:#fcc;"
| 10
| February 14
| Meralco
| L 84–99
| Jayson Castro (24)
| Tautuaa, Williams (12)
| Jayson Castro (4)
| Smart Araneta Coliseum
| 4–6
|- style="background:#bfb;"
| 11
| February 28
| NLEX
| W 101–75
| Cruz, Williams (17)
| Kelly Williams (16)
| four players (4)
| Mall of Asia Arena
| 5–6

Playoffs

Bracket

Game log

|- style="background:#bfb;"
| 1
| March 4
| Phoenix
| W 118–97
| Troy Rosario (18)
| Jayson Castro (8)
| Jayson Castro (9)
| Smart Araneta Coliseum
| 1–0

|- style="background:#fcc;"
| 1
| March 6
| San Miguel
| L 93–106
| Castro, Troy Rosario (19)
| Troy Rosario (7)
| Jayson Castro (8)
| Mall of Asia Arena
| 0–1

Commissioner's Cup

Eliminations

Standings

Game log

|- style="background:#bfb;"
| 1
| April 22
| GlobalPort
| W 128–114
| Jayson Castro (21)
| Jeremy Tyler (12)
| Jayson Castro (10)
| Smart Araneta Coliseum
| 1–0
|- style="background:#bfb;"
| 2
| April 28
| Phoenix
| W 106–98
| Terrence Romeo (21)
| Jeremy Tyler (15)
| Jayson Castro (7)
| Ynares Center
| 2–0

|- style="background:#bfb;"
| 3
| May 6
| Barangay Ginebra
| W 96–92
| Jayson Castro (27)
| Jeremy Tyler (15)
| Castro, Cruz (5)
| Mall of Asia Arena
| 3–0
|- style="background:#fcc;"
| 4
| May 13
| Alaska
| L 100–110
| Jayson Castro (18)
| Rosario, Tyler (11)
| Terrence Romeo (8)
| Ynares Center
| 3–1
|- style="background:#bfb;"
| 5
| May 18
| Blackwater
| W 120–101
| Ryan Reyes (18)
| Troy Rosario (11)
| Cruz, Garcia (5)
| Smart Araneta Coliseum
| 4–1
|- align="center"
|colspan="9" bgcolor="#bbcaff"|All-Star Break

|- style="background:#bfb;"
| 6
| June 1
| Columbian
| W 123–95
| Troy Rosario (21)
| Terrence Romeo (7)
| Jericho Cruz (7)
| Mall of Asia Arena
| 5–1
|- style="background:#bfb;"
| 7
| June 3
| NLEX
| W 117–106
| Joshua Smith (24)
| Joshua Smith (13)
| Terrence Romeo (8)
| Mall of Asia Arena
| 6–1
|- style="background:#fcc;"
| 8
| June 13
| Magnolia
| L 89–111
| Terrence Romeo (17)
| Joshua Smith (13)
| Terrence Romeo (7)
| Mall of Asia Arena
| 6–2
|- style="background:#fcc;"
| 9
| June 16
| San Miguel
| L 94–100
| Joshua Smith (26)
| Joshua Smith (18)
| Jayson Castro (6)
| Mall of Asia Arena
| 6–3
|- style="background:#bfb;"
| 10
| June 22
| Meralco
| W 91–85
| Troy Rosario (30)
| Troy Rosario (12)
| Jayson Castro (3)
| Smart Araneta Coliseum
| 7–3

|- style="background:#bfb;"
| 11
| July 7
| Rain or Shine
| W 100–85
| Joshua Smith (25)
| Joshua Smith (13)
| Terrence Romeo (12)
| Smart Araneta Coliseum
| 8–3

Playoffs

Bracket

Game log

|- style="background:#fcc;"
| 1
| July 9
| San Miguel
| L 110–121
| Pogoy, Smith (17)
| Castro, Smith (8)
| Jayson Castro (9)
| Smart Araneta Coliseum
| 0–1
|- style="background:#fcc;"
| 2
| July 11
| San Miguel
| L 102–106
| Terrence Romeo (28)
| Joshua Smith (18)
| Jayson Castro (9)
| Smart Araneta Coliseum
| 0–2

Governors' Cup

Eliminations

Standings

Game log

|- style="background:#fcc;"
| 1
| August 17
| NLEX
| L 90–103
| Terrence Romeo (27)
| Mike Glover (15)
| Jayson Castro (5)
| Ynares Center
| 0–1
|- style="background:#bfb;"
| 2
| August 19
| Meralco
| W 92–90
| Terrence Romeo (23)
| Kelly Williams (9)
| Terrence Romeo (10)
| Ynares Center
| 1–1
|- style="background:#fcc;"
| 3
| August 24
| Blackwater
| L 98–104 (OT)
| Terrence Romeo (24)
| Stacy Davis (16)
| Castro, Romeo (3)
| Mall of Asia Arena
| 1–2
|- style="background:#fcc;"
| 4
| August 26
| Alaska
| L 96–125
| Stacy Davis (26)
| Stacy Davis (12)
| Stacy Davis (7)
| Smart Araneta Coliseum
| 1–3
|- style="background:#fcc;"
| 5
| August 31
| Phoenix
| L 82–112
| Alfrancis Tamsi (14)
| Stacy Davis (11)
| RR Garcia (5)
| Smart Araneta Coliseum
| 1–4

|- style="background:#bfb;"
| 6
| September 2
| Columbian
| W 118–114 (OT)
| Jayson Castro (25)
| Roger Pogoy (12)
| Jayson Castro (7)
| Smart Araneta Coliseum
| 2–4
|- style="background:#bfb;"
| 7
| September 22
| Rain or Shine
| W 110–104
| Marqus Blakely (26)
| Marqus Blakely (14)
| Marqus Blakely (8)
| City of Passi Arena
| 3–4
|- style="background:#bfb;"
| 8
| September 30
| NorthPort
| W 104–102
| Terrence Romeo (26)
| Marqus Blakely (11)
| Terrence Romeo (8)
| Smart Araneta Coliseum
| 4–4

|- style="background:#fcc;"
| 9
| October 20
| San Miguel
| L 96–107
| Marqus Blakely (26)
| Marqus Blakely (18)
| Marqus Blakely (8)
| Calasiao Sports Complex
| 4–5
|- style="background:#fcc;"
| 10
| October 26
| Magnolia
| L 103–116
| Terrence Romeo (23)
| Marqus Blakely (18)
| Marqus Blakely (11)
| Ynares Center
| 4–6

|- style="background:#fcc;"
| 11
| November 4
| Barangay Ginebra
| L 93–112
| Marqus Blakely (23)
| Marqus Blakely (15)
| Jayson Castro (12)
| Smart Araneta Coliseum
| 4–7

Transactions

Trades

Pre season

All-Filipino Cup

Recruited imports

Awards

References

TNT Tropang Giga seasons
TNT